The 10th Coast Regiment, Royal New Zealand Artillery was a territorial coastal artillery regiment of the New Zealand Army. The regiment was formed in 1940 as 10th Heavy Regiment, New Zealand Artillery and controlled the coastal defence batteries around Wellington Harbour. The regiment was progressively expanded and by the end of the war had batteries all over the lower North Island. The regiment was reduced to a cadre in 1957 and disbanded in 1967, along with the other coastal artillery regiments (9th and 11th).

History

Since the First World War, the coastal defences of Wellington had come under a single battery, 15 Heavy Battery (15 Coast Battery prior to 1934). In March 1940, 15 Heavy Battery was broken up into three batteries and the overall force  increased in manpower. The 10th Heavy Regiment was formed in July 1940 to command the Wellington defence batteries, which included both coastal artillery and anti-aircraft artillery. In 1941, the regiment was expanded to include the coastal artillery batteries which covered other ports in the lower North Island. At its peak size in 1943, the regiment consisted of eight batteries in nine locations:
70 Battery (Palmer Head: three 6" Mk XXI)
71 Battery (Fort Dorset: two 6" Mk VII, two 4" Mk VII and four 12-pounder guns)
72 Battery (Fort Ballance: two 4" Mk VII, one twin 6-pounder and two 75 mm guns)
73 Battery (Opau, two 6" Mk VII guns)
77 Battery (Napier: two 6" Mk VII and four 40 mm Bofors. Gisborne: one 5" Mk VIII gun)
78 Battery (New Plymouth, two 155 mm, four 40-mm Bofors
140 Battery (Wanganui: one 5" Mk VIII Gun
165 Battery (Wrights Hill, two 9.2" Mk XV guns)

The regiment name was changed to 10th Coast Regiment in October 1944 and in the same year, the coastal defences were effectively mothballed. After the war it was decided that only the defences at Wellington should be kept in an operational state by a small peacetime garrison. In 1948 the territorial force was reorganised. All the New Zealand Artillery became part of the Royal New Zealand Artillery and the batteries were renumbered as:
101 Battery (Fort Dorset)
102 Battery (Palmer Head)
103 Battery (Fort Ballance)
104 Battery (Wrights Hill and the twin 6-pounder at Fort Ballance)

It was decided in 1957 that the coastal artillery regiments were no longer necessary. The armament and equipment were placed on a care and maintenance basis, while the regiment was reduced to a cadre. Over the coming years, the equipment was scrapped and much of the facilities and land were sold off. The regiment eventually dropped to a single quartermaster sergeant, but continued to exist on paper until it was formally disbanded in 1967.

Notes
 Citations

 References

Artillery regiments of New Zealand
Coastal artillery regiments
Military units and formations established in 1940
Military units and formations disestablished in 1967